Forfar Academy is a comprehensive school serving the community in and around the market town of Forfar, Angus, Scotland.

In 2019, Forfar Academy was ranked 251 out of 339 secondary schools in Scotland for pupils achieving 5 highers or more.

Notable former pupils 

 J. M. Barrie<ref>{{Cite ODNB|id=30617|title=Barrie, Sir James Matthew, baronet (1860–1937)

References

External links 
 School website

Secondary schools in Angus, Scotland
Forfar